Toshiko is a feminine Japanese given name.

Possible writings
敏子 "agile/clever, child"
俊子 "genius, child"
淑子 "graceful/polite, child"
寿子 "longevity, child"
年子 "year/age, child"
歳子 "age/time, child"
稔子 "humble, child"

The name can also be written in hiragana (としこ) or katakana (トシコ).

People with the name 
, Japanese politician
, Japanese musician (jazz pianist, composer, arranger, bandleader)
Toshiko D'Elia (born 1930), American Masters athletics long distance runner
, Japanese singer and songwriter
, Japanese voice actress
, Japanese politician of the New Komeito Party
, Japanese swimmer
, Japanese communist politician
Toshiko Higashikuni (1896–1978), aka Princess Yasu aka Princess Toshiko, 9th daughter of the Japanese Emperor Meiji 
, writer (poet) 
, name birth of Japanese actress
, aka Toshiko Nakajima, Japanese feminist, writer (under the pen-name Shōen)
Toshiko Kohno, principal flutist in the U.S. National Symphony Orchestra 
, singer and member of Capsule
, athlete (table tennis world champion, 1969) 
, Japanese gymnast
Toshiko Mori, Japanese-born American architect
, Japanese voice actress
, Japanese gymnast and 1964 Olympic medalist
, Japanese textile artist
Toshiko Takaezu (1922–2011), Japanese American ceramic artist
, Japanese novelist
Toshiko Ueda (1917–2008), Japanese manga artist
, musician (koto), Living National Treasure
, Japanese nuclear physicist

Fictional characters 
Toshiko Kasen, a character in the Grand Theft Auto: Liberty City Stories video game
Toshiko Sato, a protagonist in the television series Torchwood and briefly appeared in Doctor Who

Japanese feminine given names